Amydrium is a genus of flowering plants in the family Araceae that is native to Southeast Asia, southern China, and New Guinea.

Amydrium is distinguished from other members of the tribe Monstereae by having two ovules in each ovary. The seeds tend to be heart shaped. The leaves of Amydrium often show fenestration.

Amydrium hainanense (H.Li, Y.Shiao & S.L.Tseng) H.Li - Guangdong, Guangxi, Hainan, Hunan, Yunnan, Vietnam
Amydrium humile Schott - Peninsular Malaysia, Sumatra
Amydrium medium (Zoll. & Moritzi) Nicolson - Myanmar, Thailand, Peninsular Malaysia, Sumatra, Borneo, Java, Maluku, Philippines
Amydrium sinense (Engl.) H.Li - Vietnam, Guangxi, Guizhou, Hubei, Hunan, Sichuan, Yunnan 
Amydrium zippelianum (Schott) Nicolson - Maluku, Philippines, Sulawesi, New Guinea

References

Monsteroideae
Araceae genera